Mërgim Berisha (born 11 May 1998) is a German professional footballer who plays as a centre-forward for  club FC Augsburg, on loan from Fenerbahçe.

Club career

Liefering
On 7 November 2014, Berisha made his debut as a professional footballer against Mattersburg after coming on as a substitute at 73rd minute in place of Daniel Ripić and just 50 seconds after his substitution scored his side's third goal during a 3–1 home win.

Red Bull Salzburg
On 28 December 2016, Berisha signed his first professional contract with Austrian Bundesliga side Red Bull Salzburg after agreeing to a four-year deal. On 3 April 2017, he made his debut in a 0–5 away win against SC Rheindorf Altach after coming on as a substitute at 77th minute in place of Wanderson. Berisha helped his team winning the 2016–17 UEFA Youth League by being one of the top scorers in the tournament, scoring seven goals in total.

Loan at LASK
On 21 August 2017, Berisha joined Austrian Bundesliga side LASK, on a season-long loan. Five days later, he made his debut in a 1–0 away defeat against Rapid Wien after being named in the starting line-up.

Loan at 1. FC Magdeburg
On 19 June 2018, Berisha joined 2. Bundesliga side 1. FC Magdeburg, on a season-long loan. Two months later, he made his debut with 1. FC Magdeburg in the 2018–19 DFB-Pokal first round against Darmstadt 98 after coming on as a substitute at 81st minute in place of Tobias Müller.

Loan at SC Rheindorf Altach
On 10 January 2019, Berisha joined Austrian Bundesliga side SC Rheindorf Altach, on a -season loan. On 23 February 2019, he made his debut in a 0–0 away draw against Wolfsberger AC after being named in the starting line-up.

Return to Red Bull Salzburg

2019–20 season
On 6 January 2020, Berisha returned to Austrian Bundesliga side Red Bull Salzburg. On 14 February 2020, he played the first game after the return in a 2–3 home defeat against former club LASK after coming on as a substitute in the 59th minute in place of Patrick Farkas.

2020–21 season

On 13 September 2020, Berisha commenced his season with the club by winning in the opening match of 2020–21 season against Wolfsberger AC after being named in the starting line-up.

On 3 November, Berisha scored his first UEFA Champions League goal in a 2–6 defeat against German side Bayern Munich in the 2020–21 season, he also scored in the away tie in Munich as Salzburg lost 3–1. On 1 December, Berisha scored two goals against Russian side Lokomotiv Moscow, which allowed Red Bull Salzburg win the match in Moscow 3–1, to secure third place in the group and reach the 2020–21 UEFA Europa League knockout phase.

On 1 May 2021, Berisha scored Salzburg's opening goal in an eventual 3–0 defeat of his former club LASK in the final of the Austrian Cup, securing the club's third straight domestic cup title.

Fenerbahçe
On 2 September 2021, Berisha signed a four-year contract with Süper Lig club Fenerbahçe and received squad number 11.

Loan at Augsburg
On 31 August 2022, Berisha joined Augsburg on loan with an option to buy.

International career
On 7 October 2019, Berisha received a call-up from Germany U21 for the friendly match against Spain U21 and 2021 UEFA European Under-21 Championship qualification match against Bosnia and Herzegovina U21. Three days later, he made his debut with Germany U21 in a friendly match against Spain U21 after coming on as a substitute at 46th minute in place of Janni Serra.

On 17 March 2023, he received his first official call-up to the German senior national team for the friendlies against Peru and Belgium.

Personal life
Berisha was born in Berchtesgaden, Germany, to Kosovan parents from Suva Reka.

Career statistics

Club

Honours
Red Bull Salzburg Youth
UEFA Youth League: 2016–17

Red Bull Salzburg
Austrian Bundesliga: 2016–17, 2019–20, 2020–21
Austrian Cup: 2016–17, 2019–20, 2020–21

References

External links

1998 births
Living people
People from Berchtesgaden
Sportspeople from Upper Bavaria
Footballers from Bavaria
German footballers
Germany under-21 international footballers
German people of Kosovan descent
Association football forwards
FC Liefering players
FC Red Bull Salzburg players
LASK players
SC Rheindorf Altach players
1. FC Magdeburg players
FC Augsburg players
Fenerbahçe S.K. footballers
2. Liga (Austria) players
Austrian Football Bundesliga players
2. Bundesliga players
Süper Lig players
German expatriate footballers
Expatriate footballers in Austria
German expatriate sportspeople in Austria
Expatriate footballers in Turkey
German expatriate sportspeople in Turkey